Roger T. Pratt (born 1944) was a Welsh cyclist from Cardiff, Wales. He began road racing in 1962, winning his first event the following year. In 1965 he rode the Tour of Britain Milk Race for the Britannia team (after one of the French riders dropped out). Drug testing was introduced for the first time in this race and Pratt was tested twice.

Pratt became the Welsh Road Race Champion in 1965. He rode the Tour of Britain Milk Race again in 1966 in the Midlands team of Hugh Porter and Les West and also represented Wales at the 1966 Commonwealth Games in Kingston, Jamaica, riding the Road Race and the Individual Pursuit events.

After 5 years of competition in the UK he retired from competition aged only 23, in 1967. Pratt raced again briefly in 1988 when he became Welsh Veterans Road Race Champion.

References

Living people
Welsh male cyclists
Cyclists at the 1966 British Empire and Commonwealth Games
Commonwealth Games competitors for Wales
1944 births
Sportspeople from Cardiff